Uttar Pradesh Rajya Vidyut Utpadan Nigam Limited (UPRVUNL) was constituted on dated 25.08.1980 under the Companies' Act 1956 for construction of new thermal power projects in the state sector. On 14 January 2000, in accordance to U.P. State Electr Reforms Acts 1999 and operation of U.P. Electricity Reforms Transfer Scheme 2000, U.P. State Electricity Board (U.P.S.E.B.), till then responsible for generation, transmission and distribution of power within the state of Uttar Pradesh, was unbundled and operations of the state sector thermal power stations were handed over to UPRVUNL. Unchahar Thermal Power Station - 420 MW (2X210) & Tanda Thermal Power Station 440 MW (4X110) were transferred to NTPC in year 1992 & year 2000 respectively before unbundling of U.P. State Electricity Board (U.P.S.E.B.) into; 
 Uttar Pradesh Rajya Vidyut Utpadan Nigam Limited (UPRVUNL),
 Uttar Pradesh Power Corporation Limited (UPPCL), 
 UP Power Transmission Corporation Limited (UPPTCL), 
 UP Jal Vidyut Nigam Limited (UPJVNL).

Power plants

Past Transitions (6,810 MW)

Erstwhile Uttar Pradesh State Electricity Board (UPSEB) transferred its thermal power stations among others to NTPC Limited against payment overdue. These power stations are;

 1,550 MW Feroze Gandhi Unchahar Thermal Power Plant (Raebareli)
 440 MW Tanda Thermal Power Station (Ambedkarnagar)

Present Installations- (7133 MW)
At present, UPRVUNL is looking after generations of power of five thermal power plants located in different parts of Uttar Pradesh, with a total installed generation capacity of 4933 MW.

 Anpara Thermal Power Station 3830 MW
 Obra Thermal Power Station 1288 MW
 Panki Thermal Power Station 210 MW
 Parichha Thermal Power Station 1140 MW
 Harduaganj Thermal Power Station 665 MW

Though installed capacity is 5933 MW but UPRVUNL is not able to utilize its full capacity ever due poor maintenance, lack of funds, aging plants & frequent units tripping.

Future Expansions

Construction Stage- (7920 MW)
 Meja Stage I Meja Thermal Power Station, Meja Urja Nigam Private Limited (In 50:50 equity JV with NTPC Limited) - 2X660 (1320 MW)
 Karchana Thermal Power Station - 2×660 (1320MW)
 Harduaganj Extn.2 - 1×660 (660 MW)
 Jawaharpur Super Thermal Power Station, Etah district—2x660 MW by Doosan Power Systems India (DPSI).
 Ghatampur Thermal Power Station 3x660 (1980 MW)
 Obra C Thermal Power Plant 2×660 (1320 MW)
 Tanda Stage 2 NTPC Thermal Power Plant 2×660 (1320 MW)

Planning Stage- (6600 MW)

 Panki - 1x660 (660 MW)
 Obra Stage C - 2x660 (1320 MW)
 Meja Stage II - 2x660 (1320 MW)
 Ghatampur Thermal Power Station - 3×660 (1980 MW) - a Neyveli Uttar Pradesh Power Limited (In 49:51 equity JV with Neyveli Lignite Corporation Ltd.)

Human resources 

As of 1 April 2020 UPRVUNL had 1475 executives and 4966 non-executives on its roll.

References

 NTPC to build power plant in Uttar Pradesh

External links
 Home Page
 UPRVUNL Corporate Plan 2012-2017
 UP Govt gives 18 months of more time to project developers for nine power related projects to complete pending work. June 2012.

Electric-generation companies of India
Government-owned energy companies of Uttar Pradesh
Companies based in Lucknow
1980 establishments in Uttar Pradesh
Indian companies established in 1980
Energy companies established in 1980